A rhynchonelliform class, characterised by the presence of a colleplax; closest relative (?): Salanygolina.

Salanygolina

Thought to be a sister group.

References

Brachiopods